Anthony Dias Blue (born January 5, 1941) is a published author, columnist, television and radio personality and the owner of a food and wine event company in Los Angeles, California.

Career
Blue has a long-running feature spot on WCBS radio in New York City. The subject of the feature was restaurant reviews and lifestyle subjects, mostly associated with food. Later the program was expanded to include reporting about wine. Now called the Blue Lifestyle Minute, the feature has been on every day for more than 30 years (except for the two weeks following 9/11). Blue received a James Beard Award for the Minute in 2001.

A separate, localized version of The Blue Lifestyle Minute began airing in 1999 on KFWB in Los Angeles. In 2009, this feature moved to KABC along with the addition of a new weekend show called "The Taste Buds" co-hosted with Meridith May and Merrill Schindler. In 2014 Blue left KABC and moved The Blue Lifestyle Minute to KNX (AM) 1070. This brings Blue's listenership to over 200,000.

San Francisco Competitions
Blue acquired the San Francisco International Wine Competition, the largest international wine competition in the US (nearly 4,500 wines entered in 2017).
In 2000 Blue launched the San Francisco World Spirits Competition which has become the second largest spirits competition in the world. It is the biggest in the United States with more than 2500 entries in 2017.

Past publications
In 1978, Blue became West Coast Editor of Food & Wine magazine. In 1980, Blue became Wine and Spirits Editor of Bon Appétit Magazine, a position he held for 26 years. He also wrote a weekly syndicated wine column that appeared in the Bay Area, first in the San Francisco Chronicle and then in the San Jose Mercury News.
For 10 years, Blue wrote and edited the Zagat Guide for northern California for his friend Tim Zagat, with whom he attended Riverdale.

The Tasting Panel
In 2007 Blue purchased, in partnership with Publisher Meridith May, Patterson's Beverage Journal, a 65-year-old beverage trade publication that was renamed The Tasting Panel. It has become the highest circulation beverage industry publication.

The Sommelier Journal
In December 2013, The Tasting Panel  acquired The Sommelier Journal with Blue as the new Editor-in-Chief along with a team of top wine and hospitality industry writers. The first issue of the refreshed publication was distributed in Spring of 2014.

Blue Lifestyle
Blue now runs one of the nation’s most successful producers of wine and food events, creating large trade tastings, wine seminars, lunches and dinners for wineries and wine associations around the world.

Other
In 2001 Blue also served as the color commentator on the short-lived reality television series Iron Chef USA.

Bibliography
Mr. Blue has written nine books including American Wine, The Complete Book of Mixed Drinks, The Complete Book of Spirits, and Anthony Dias Blue's Pocket Guide to Wine. With his wife, Kathryn Blue, he has also authored two cookbooks, Thanksgiving Dinner and America's Kitchen.

Accolades
In 1988, Blue was selected for the James Beard Who's Who in Food Award, in 2000 he was nominated for a James Beard Award as "Wine & Spirits Personality of the Year". He won the 1997 Communicator of the Year Award from the International Wine & Spirits Competition in London. In 2001 he was awarded a James Beard Award for The Blue Lifestyle Minute.

References

1941 births
American columnists
Television personalities from Los Angeles
Living people
Radio personalities from Los Angeles
Writers from California
Food and drink in California
Culture of San Francisco
Bon Appétit people